Ordsall Hall Comprehensive School was a comprehensive school situated on Ordsall Road in the market town of East Retford in the district of Bassetlaw, Nottinghamshire.

History
In 2003 it merged with the King Edward VI Grammar School to become Retford Oaks High School a new complex built on a greenfield site. Following its closure, the school buildings and the Old Hall were demolished. The site was used for a new Post-16 Centre for Retford.

Previous Head masters include:

 Walter Oliver Howells
 Mike James
 Arthur Deakin

Notable alumni
 Sarah-Jane Honeywell, TV presenter

Defunct schools in Nottinghamshire
Educational institutions established in 1958
Educational institutions disestablished in 2003
1958 establishments in England
2003 disestablishments in England
Retford
Demolished buildings and structures in England